The 2017 Paris–Nice was a road cycling stage race that took place between 5 and 12 March. It was the 75th edition of the Paris–Nice and was the sixth event of the 2017 UCI World Tour.

 won the race for the fifth time in six years, with Sergio Henao managing to fend off a final-day attack from 's Alberto Contador to win the race by just two seconds. The podium was completed by de la Cruz's teammate Dan Martin, 30 seconds in arrears of Henao.

 were able to win the teams classification, with Julian Alaphilippe also finishing in the top-five overall, having held the race lead for three days during the week. Alaphilippe was the winner of the young rider classification, while four top-five stage finishes including a win in the individual time trial was also enough for him to clinch the points classification.

Teams
As Paris–Nice was a UCI World Tour event, all eighteen UCI WorldTeams were invited automatically and obliged to enter a team in the race. Four UCI Professional Continental teams competed, completing the 22-team peloton.

Just as they did in the 2016 edition of the race,  chose to compete under a different name from the rest of the season: they became Lotto Fix ALL, taking the name of a product made by Soudal, their normal sponsor. They also wore blue and white jerseys in place of their normal red and white.

Route
The route of the 2017 Paris–Nice was announced on 3 January 2017. The race started with a road stage for the first time since 2014, with a circuit race around Bois-d'Arcy in the Yvelines department. A mountain-top time trial was also scheduled for the race, but unlike previous years, it was not held on the Col d'Èze. However, it was scheduled for Mont Brouilly, a -long climb with an average gradient of 7.7%, but reaching over 9% in the final kilometre. Mont Brouilly was due to feature as a stage finish in the 2016 Paris–Nice, but the stage was ultimately cancelled due to snow.

Both mountains had previously featured during the fifteenth stage of the 1975 Tour de France, when Bernard Thévenet ultimately wrested what would have been a sixth yellow jersey away from Eddy Merckx, at the finish at Pra-Loup. The final stage finished along the seafront in Nice, but not on the Promenade des Anglais as customary, as a mark of respect to the victims of the Bastille Day terrorist attack in 2016. Instead, the race ended at the Quai des États-Unis.

Stages

Stage 1
5 March 2017 — Bois-d'Arcy to Bois-d'Arcy,

Stage 2
6 March 2017 — Rochefort-en-Yvelines to Amilly,

Stage 3
7 March 2017 — Chablis to Chalon-sur-Saône,

Stage 4
8 March 2017 — Beaujeu to Mont Brouilly, individual time trial (ITT)

Stage 5
9 March 2017 — Quincié-en-Beaujolais to Bourg-de-Péage,

Stage 6
10 March 2017 — Aubagne to Fayence,

Stage 7
11 March 2017 — Nice to Col de la Couillole,

Stage 8
12 March 2017 — Nice to Nice,

Classification leadership table

In the 2017 Paris–Nice, four jerseys were awarded. The general classification was calculated by adding each cyclist's finishing times on each stage. Time bonuses were awarded to the first three finishers on all stages except for the individual time trial: the stage winner won a ten-second bonus, with six and four seconds for the second and third riders respectively. Bonus seconds were also awarded to the first three riders at intermediate sprints – three seconds for the winner of the sprint, two seconds for the rider in second and one second for the rider in third. The leader of the general classification received a yellow jersey. This classification was considered the most important of the 2017 Paris–Nice, and the winner of the classification was considered the winner of the race.

The second classification was the points classification. Riders were awarded points for finishing in the top ten in a stage. Unlike in the points classification in the Tour de France, the winners of all stages were awarded the same number of points. Points were also won in intermediate sprints; three points for crossing the sprint line first, two points for second place, and one for third. The leader of the points classification was awarded a green jersey.

There was also a mountains classification, for which points were awarded for reaching the top of a climb before other riders. Each climb was categorised as either first, second, or third-category, with more points available for the more difficult, higher-categorised climbs. For first-category climbs, the top seven riders earned points; on second-category climbs, five riders won points; on third-category climbs, only the top three riders earned points. The leadership of the mountains classification was marked by a white jersey with red polka-dots.

The fourth jersey represented the young rider classification, marked by a white jersey, which was restored after not being awarded in 2016. Only riders born after 1 January 1992 were eligible; the young rider best placed in the general classification was the leader of the young rider classification. There was also a classification for teams, in which the times of the best three cyclists in a team on each stage were added together; the leading team at the end of the race was the team with the lowest cumulative time.

Notes

References

External links

2017 UCI World Tour
2017 in French sport
2017
March 2017 sports events in France